Netley railway station is located near the village of Netley in Hampshire, England. The station is run by South Western Railway and is on the West Coastway Line. Near to the station is Royal Victoria Country Park. The line into the village from the west was built by the Southampton and Netley Railway, though by the time it was opened in March 1866 the aforementioned company had been taken over by the London and South Western Railway.

From 1900 a branch from the station conveyed patients to the nearby Netley Hospital. Heavy casualties during the First World War resulted in the station being for a time the third-busiest in Britain.

Services 

These are operated by South Western Railway. The occasional service operated by Southern stops here in the morning and evening peak.

References

External links 

Railway stations in Hampshire
DfT Category E stations
Former London and South Western Railway stations
Railway stations in Great Britain opened in 1866
Railway stations served by South Western Railway
1866 establishments in England
Railway stations served by Govia Thameslink Railway